Denish Das (born 17 May 2002) is an Indian cricketer. He made his Twenty20 debut on 10 January 2021, for Assam in the 2020–21 Syed Mushtaq Ali Trophy. He made his List A debut on 21 February 2021, for Assam in the 2020–21 Vijay Hazare Trophy.

References

External links
 

2002 births
Living people
Indian cricketers
Assam cricketers
Cricketers from Guwahati